XHCT-FM is a radio station on 95.7 FM in Cuernavaca, Morelos, Mexico. It carries the Exa FM pop format of its owner, MVS Radio.

History
XHCT received its concession on November 25, 1971. The station was owned by Pedro Antonio Calleja Tuero. In 1983, MVS bought the station under the concessionaire Frecuencia Modulada de Cuernavaca, S.A; this and other MVS concessionaires were later consolidated into Stereorey México. Under MVS, the station flipped to the FM Globo romantic format, which was replaced nationally by Exa FM in 2000.

References

External links
Exa FM 95.7 Facebook

Spanish-language radio stations
Radio stations in Morelos
MVS Radio
Radio stations established in 1971
1971 establishments in Mexico